Agonum sexpunctatum is a wet-loving, peatland species of ground beetle native to the Palearctic and the Near East.

In Europe, it is found in Albania, Belarus, Benelux, the Baltic states, Finland, France, Italy, Liechtenstein, Portugal, Russia, Scandinavia, Spain, Ukraine, the former Yugoslavian states and Central Europe. It is absent in Ireland.

References

sexpunctatum
Beetles described in 1758
Beetles of Europe
Taxa named by Carl Linnaeus